James Dwight Honeyford (born January 24, 1939) is an American politician of the Republican Party. He served as a member of the Washington State Senate, representing District 15 between 1999 and 2023.

Open Government
In February 2011, Honeyford walked out on a legislative hearing in protest of "ghost bills" that are heard in committee, but not written until later.  In September 2011, Honeyford was awarded the "Key Award" by the Washington Coalition for Open Government.

Racism controversy
On March 2, 2015, Seattle-based newspaper The Stranger reported that, during a committee hearing about a proposed racial impact statement bill, Honeyford shared his belief that "poor" and "colored" people were most likely to commit crimes.

Awards 
 2014 Guardians of Small Business award. Presented by NFIB.

References

Republican Party Washington (state) state senators
Living people
Republican Party members of the Washington House of Representatives
Washington (state) city council members
American municipal police officers
Central Washington University alumni
People from Ontario, Oregon
1939 births
21st-century American politicians